The flag of Eritrea is the national flag of Eritrea. It was adopted on December 5th, 1995. The flag combines the basic layout and colors from the flag of the Eritrean People's Liberation Front with an emblem of a wreath and an upright olive-branch derived from the 1952–1962 flag.

The green color in the flag stands for the agriculture and livestock of the country, while the blue represents the bounty of the sea. The red stands for the blood shed in the struggle for Eritrean independence, with the 30 leaves in the wreath representing the thirty years spent in the struggle.

History and symbolism

Eritrea and Ethiopia were both occupied by the Italians between 1935 and 1941. After Italy's defeat in the East African Campaign, Ethiopia reverted to its pre-Italian feudal monarchy while Eritrea was handed over to modern British rule under a mandate by the United Nations in 1949. The advent of Arab nationalism in the 1940s saw the Muslim faction of Eritrea demand independence from British rule. Meanwhile, Ethiopia attempted to claim the Eritrean state as its own, by claiming that it was a “lost province". Several officers proposed that Eritrea be separated into two parts: the Christian area which was to be merged into Ethiopia; the Muslim area into Sudan. After international debate and the intervention of the Allied Powers, the United Nations passed a resolution regarding the agreement of Britain formulating the creation of an autonomous Eritrea in federation with Ethiopia in 1950.

On September 15, 1952, Eritrea became independent from British rule and was made an autonomous part of Ethiopia. That same year, through their elected representatives, Eritreans settled on the blue flag as their common symbol. The flag was created and designed by Degiat Beyene Zahilay, who was born in Tekonda, Akele Guzay, Eritrea. The "Blue Flag" is passionately referred to as “Khedra’’ in Tigre and “Awlie” in Tigrinya. 
The flag displayed three olive branches on a blue background: two branches with eleven leaves each, hugging a third branch that carries twelve leaves.

Previously, the unionists had rejected independence and had always yearned to be ruled by Haile Selassie, but throughout the federal period, they continued identifying themselves with the Ethiopian flag, and sabotaging the federal arrangement. Soon, Emperor Haile Selassie began to openly violate and abolish the federal arrangement; he dissolved the Eritrean parliament and outlawed the Eritrean flag which he lowered and hoisted the Ethiopian flag in its place, practically occupying Eritrea militarily. The lowering of the flag sparked the lengthy armed struggle by Eritreans for self-determination and the Eritrean flag continued to be a crucial symbol of Eritrean nationalism.

The propaganda of the Unionist Party aggressively targeted the blue flag. To them, it was the “flag of the United Nations.” At the same time, the Ethiopian Flag was promoted as one belonging to Janhoi, Haile Selassie, the elect of God. While the Ethiopian flag was given a divine value, the Eritrean flag was portrayed as one belonging to the shifta and Arab sellouts who betrayed their “Mother Ethiopia,” and they worked hard to separate the child (Eritrea) from its mother (Ethiopia). At later stages, it became difficult for some who had been raised on this propaganda to accept the blue flag. The blue Eritrean flag had been decided upon and approved by the founding fathers. Furthermore, all Eritrean parties that represented the entire social and political forces of the country, including the pan-Ethiopianist Union party, participated in the negotiations and accepted the flag as a unifying symbol of Eritrea.

On September 1, 1961, Hamid Idris Awate resurrected the blue flag suppressed by Haile Selassie. Eritrean nationalists saw it as representing their dreams and as the magnet that pulled all Eritreans together.

After civil war broke out in Eritrea in 1961, Ethiopian emperor Haile Selassie banned the Eritrean flag, coat of arms, and all other government seals from being displayed in public places. He annexed Eritrea in 1962 with the approval of the United Nations.

The blue and green Eritrean flag, however, continued to be in use as the “flag of liberation”, by the Eritrean Liberation Front (ELF). When the EPLF officially came to being, it proposed its own flag during the front's First Organizational Congress in 1977.

The current flag of Eritrea bears resemblance to the party's official flag. The flag had three triangles: red, blue, and green. The yellow star in the red triangle symbolized the country's rich mineral resources, with the five points representing unity, liberation, justice, democracy, and progress. After Eritrea was proclaimed an independent nation, the flag was modified and its first official hoisting was performed on May 24, 1993. In the red triangle, a gold wreath symbol with 14 leaves on each side, derived from the 1952 flag, replaced the gold star of the Eritrean People's Liberation Front's flag. In 1995 the number of leaves in the wreath were standardized: the 30 leaves symbolise the number of years spent in civil war before achieving independence. The flag's length to breadth ratio was changed from 2:3 to 1:2.

The official currency of Eritrea's Nakfa coins issued in 1997 featured six native animals; on the reverse the coins showed a group of Eritrean People's Liberation Front's fighters raising the national flag and the slogan "Liberty, Equality and Justice" in English language.

Description

The flag of Eritrea is dominated by a red isosceles triangle based on the hoist-side pointed toward the fly-side and then divided into two right triangles. The upper triangle is green and the lower triangle is blue with a yellow vertical olive branch encircled by an olive wreath centered on the hoist side of the triangle. The shape of the red triangle broadly mimics the shape of the country. The green stands for the agriculture and livestock of the country, blue for the bounty of the sea, and red for the bloodshed in the struggle for independence with the 30 leaves in the wreath corresponding to the thirty years spent in the struggle. The flag has proportions of 1:2.

Historical flags

References

Sources

External links

Flag
Flags of Africa
National flags
Flags introduced in 1952
Flags introduced in 1993
Flags introduced in 1995